Dryudella is a genus of wasps in the family Crabronidae. There are more than 50 described species in Dryudella.

Species
These 57 species belong to the genus Dryudella:

 Dryudella albohirsuta Kazenas, 2000
 Dryudella amenartais (Pulawski, 1959)
 Dryudella aquitana (Pulawski, 1970)
 Dryudella arabica Schmid-Egger, 2014
 Dryudella aralensis Kazenas, 2000
 Dryudella beaumonti (Pulawski, 1959)
 Dryudella bella (Cresson, 1881)
 Dryudella bidens Kazenas, 2000
 Dryudella bifasciata (von Schulthess, 1926)
 Dryudella caerulea (Cresson, 1881)
 Dryudella deserti Schmid-Egger, 2014
 Dryudella dichoptica Kazenas, 2000
 Dryudella elegans (Cresson, 1881)
 Dryudella erythrosoma (Pulawski, 1959)
 Dryudella esterinae Pagliano, 2001
 Dryudella femoralis (Mocsáry, 1877)
 Dryudella flavoundata (Arnold, 1923)
 Dryudella freygessneri (Carl, 1920)
 Dryudella frontalis (Radoszkowski, 1877)
 Dryudella immigrans (F. Williams, 1940)
 Dryudella kaplini Kazenas, 2000
 Dryudella kaszabi (Tsuneki, 1971)
 Dryudella kazakhstanica Kazenas, 2000
 Dryudella lineata Mocsáry, 1879
 Dryudella lucinda (Nurse, 1904)
 Dryudella maculifrons (Cameron, 1899)
 Dryudella maroccana (Giner Marí, 1946)
 Dryudella millsi Cockerell, 1914
 Dryudella mitjaevi Kazenas, 2000
 Dryudella mongolica (Tsuneki, 1971)
 Dryudella montana (Cresson, 1881)
 Dryudella monticola (Giner Marí, 1946)
 Dryudella nephertiti (Pulawski, 1959)
 Dryudella nuristanica (Balthasar, 1957)
 Dryudella obo (Tsuneki, 1971)
 Dryudella opaca (Pulawski, 1959)
 Dryudella orientalis (F. Smith, 1856)
 Dryudella osiriaca (Pulawski, 1959)
 Dryudella pernix F. Parker, 1969
 Dryudella picta (Kohl, 1888)
 Dryudella picticornis (Gussakovskij, 1927)
 Dryudella pinguis (Dahlbom, 1832)
 Dryudella pseudofemoralis Nemkov, 1990
 Dryudella pulawskii Schmid-Egger, 2014
 Dryudella quadripunctata (Radoszkowski, 1877)
 Dryudella rasnitsyni Kazenas, 2000
 Dryudella rhimpa F. Parker, 1969
 Dryudella sepulchralis (de Beaumont, 1968)
 Dryudella similis (Gussakovskij, 1927)
 Dryudella stigma (Panzer, 1807)
 Dryudella tegularis (F. Morawitz, 1889)
 Dryudella tobiasi Kazenas, 2000
 Dryudella tricolor (Vander Linden, 1829)
 Dryudella unicolor Schmid-Egger, 2014
 Dryudella vanharteni Schmid-Egger, 2014
 Dryudella veronikae Kazenas, 2000
 Dryudella xanthocera (Pulawski, 1961)

References

External links

 

Crabronidae
Articles created by Qbugbot